Borsani is a surname. Notable people with the surname include:

 Osvaldo Borsani (1911–1985), Italian architect and furniture designer
 Pierina Borsani (1909–1960), Italian basketball player
 , Argentinian politician